These are the official results of the Men's 800 metres event at the 1978 European Championships in Prague, Czechoslovakia.  The final was held on 31 August 1978.

The two favourites for the race were Steve Ovett and Sebastian Coe  Ovett had won silver at 800 m at the previous European Championships in 1974 in Rome, and had won the 1500m, in spectacular fashion, at the IAAF World Cup the previous year (he was to remain unbeaten at that distance until the 1980 Olympics). Coe was the new British record holder at 800 m and the fastest man that year leading into the race at 800 m.

The race was billed in the press, the British press in particular, as a 'Coe versus Ovett' contest -  a race that was the start of a rivalry that was to dominate not only British and European but World middle-distance running over the next few years. However, by concentrating on Coe and Ovett the press were ignoring the other talents in the race, including East Germany's Olaf Beyer.

In the race itself, Coe led from the front setting a blistering first lap pace, going through the bell in a suicidal 49.32 s. At 700 m, he was spent and Ovett kicked past him for home. However, the fast-finishing Beyer first caught Coe and then Ovett to strike gold, in doing so recording the fastest time that year.

Medalists

Results

Final
31 August

Semi-finals
30 August

Semi-final 1

Semi-final 2

Heats
29 August

Heat 1

Heat 2

Heat 3

Heat 4

Participation
According to an unofficial count, 24 athletes from 15 countries participated in the event.

 (1)
 (3)
 (1)
 (2)
 (1)
 (1)
 (1)
 (1)
 (1)
 (1)
 (3)
 (1)
 (3)
 (2)
 (2)

See also
 1974 Men's European Championships 800 metres (Rome)
 1976 Men's Olympic 800 metres (Montreal)
 1980 Men's Olympic 800 metres (Moscow)
 1982 Men's European Championships 800 metres (Athens)
 1983 Men's World Championships 800 metres (Helsinki)
 1984 Men's Olympic 800 metres (Los Angeles)
 1986 Men's European Championships 800 metres (Stuttgart)

References

Other Links
 Results 1978 European Championship Results

800 metres
800 metres at the European Athletics Championships